Fernando Joe Gaitan Jr. (born August 22, 1948) is a senior United States district judge of the United States District Court for the Western District of Missouri.

Early life and education

Born in Kansas City, Kansas, Gaitan graduated from Sumner High School in Kansas City, Kansas in 1966. Gaitan attended Donnelly College in Kansas City, Kansas from 1967 to 1968 and received a Bachelor of Science from Pittsburg State University in Pittsburg, Kansas in 1970 and a Juris Doctor from the University of Missouri-Kansas City School of Law in 1974.

Career

Gaitan was an attorney for Southwestern Bell Telephone Company from 1974 to 1980. He was a judge on the Sixteenth Judicial Circuit Court of Missouri from 1980 to 1986, and then on the Missouri Court of Appeals, Western District, until 1991.

Federal judicial service

On May 16, 1991, Gaitan was nominated by President George H. W. Bush to a seat on the United States District Court for the Western District of Missouri vacated by Russell Gentry Clark. Gaitan was confirmed by the United States Senate on July 18, 1991, and received his commission on August 2, 1991. He served as Chief Judge from 2007 to 2014. He took senior status on January 3, 2014.

See also 
 List of African-American federal judges
 List of African-American jurists

References

Sources
 

1948 births
Living people
African-American judges
Judges of the United States District Court for the Western District of Missouri
United States district court judges appointed by George H. W. Bush
20th-century American judges
Missouri state court judges
Missouri Court of Appeals judges
Pittsburg State University alumni
University of Missouri–Kansas City alumni
21st-century American judges